The Messi–Ronaldo rivalry, or Ronaldo–Messi rivalry, is a sporting rivalry in football propelled by the media and fans that involves Argentine footballer Lionel Messi and Portuguese footballer Cristiano Ronaldo, mainly for being contemporaries and for their similar records and sporting success. They spent nine seasons in the prime of their careers facing off regularly while playing for rival clubs Barcelona and Real Madrid.

Together they have achieved various historical milestones in the sport, coming to be considered as two of the best players of all time. They are two of the most decorated footballers ever, having won a combined 76 major trophies (Messi 42, Ronaldo 34) during their senior careers thus far, and have regularly broken the 50-goal barrier in a single season. They are among the eight players to score over 700 goals each in their careers for club and country. Ronaldo holds the record for most official goals in a career.

 

Journalists and pundits regularly argue the individual merits of both players in an attempt to establish who they believe is the best player in modern football or ever. Regardless of preference, football critics generally agree that they are both the best players of their generation, outperforming their peers by a significant margin. Ronaldo has received praise for his physical attributes, goalscoring skills, leadership and performance under pressure, while Messi is lauded for his combination of dribbling, playmaking, passing and goalscoring. It has been compared to past global sports rivalries such as the Muhammad Ali–Joe Frazier rivalry in boxing, the Prost–Senna rivalry in motorsport, and the tennis rivalries between Federer–Nadal and Borg–McEnroe. Some commentators choose to analyse the differing physiques and playing styles of the two, while part of the debate revolves around the contrasting personalities of the two players; Ronaldo is sometimes described as someone of temperamental character while Messi is considered to have a more reserved personality.  

After Messi led Argentina to victory in the 2022 FIFA World Cup, a number of football critics, commentators and players have opined that Messi has settled the debate between the two players.

History 
In 2007, Ronaldo and Messi finished as runners-up to A.C. Milan's Kaká in both the Ballon d'Or, an award rewarded to the player voted as the best in the world by an international panel of sports journalists, and the FIFA World Player of the Year, an award voted for by coaches and captains of international teams. In an interview that year, Messi was quoted as saying that "Cristiano Ronaldo is an extraordinary player and it would be brilliant to be in the same team as him."

They first played in a game against each other when Manchester United were drawn to play Barcelona in the 2007–08 UEFA Champions League semi-finals and were immediately pitted as major rivals. Ronaldo missed a penalty in the first leg, but United eventually advanced to the final via a Paul Scholes goal. At the end of the year, Ronaldo was awarded the Ballon d'Or and vowed that he would win the award again.

The 2009 UEFA Champions League Final was contested between Manchester United and Barcelona on 27 May 2009 at the Stadio Olimpico in Rome, Italy. The match, described as a "dream clash", was again hyped as the latest battle between the two, this time to settle who was the best player in the world; Ronaldo claimed he was the better of the two, while Messi's club-mate Xavi sided with him. Manchester United manager Alex Ferguson was more diplomatic, praising both players as being amongst the world's elite talents. Messi, playing in a central role he was unaccustomed to so he would avoid a direct battle with Manchester United left-back Patrice Evra, scored Barcelona's second in a 2–0 victory with a header in the 70th minute. Meanwhile, Ronaldo was subdued for much of the game, despite some early chances to score, and his frustration eventually showed when he was booked for a rash tackle on Carles Puyol.

From 2009 to 2018, the two played against each other at least twice per season during El Clásico matches but also met many other times in competitions such as the Copa del Rey, the Supercopa de España, and a two-legged Champions League semi-final in 2011.

Following Ronaldo's transfer to Juventus in the summer of 2018, the two faced each other only one more time in the next four seasons when Ronaldo's two goals from the penalty spot helped Juventus to a 3–0 away win against Messi's Barcelona in the 2020–21 UEFA Champions League group stage.

On 21 January 2023, the two played each other for the first time in over two years, as a combined team featuring Al-Hilal and Ronaldo's Al-Nassr was defeated 4–5 by Messi's Paris Saint-Germain in an exhibition friendly in Riyadh. Messi scored once and Ronaldo twice in the game, which was described as potentially being the last ever match featuring both players.

Relationship between Messi and Ronaldo 
In a 2016 interview, Ronaldo commented on the rivalry by saying: "I think we push each other sometimes in the competition, this is why the competition is so high." Alex Ferguson, Ronaldo's manager during his time at Manchester United, opined: "I don't think the rivalry against each other bothers them. I think they have their own personal pride in terms of wanting to be the best." Messi has denied any rivalry, and blames the media for creating it, stating that "only the media, the press, who wants us to be at loggerheads but I've never fought with Cristiano."

It is widely argued and documented that there is an atmosphere of competition between the duo, with Guillem Balagué claiming in the book Ronaldo that he refers to his Argentine counterpart as a "motherfucker" behind his back, and Luca Caioli saying in his book Ronaldo: The Obsession for Perfection that, according to his sources, Ronaldo heats up when watching Messi play. In response to claims that he and Messi do not get on well on a personal level, Ronaldo commented: "We don't have a relationship outside the world of football, just as we don't with a lot of other players", before adding that in years to come he hopes they can laugh about it together, stating: "We have to look on this rivalry with a positive spirit, because it's a good thing." In November 2014, Ronaldo also threatened to take legal action over the remarks made by Balagué. After Ronaldo's departure from Real Madrid to Juventus, Messi admitted to missing him, saying: "I miss Cristiano. Although it was a bit difficult to see him win trophies, he gave La Liga prestige." During a joint interview at the UEFA Player of the Year ceremony in 2019, Ronaldo said he would like to "have dinner together in the future", to which Messi later replied: "If I get an invitation, why not?"

Awards and records 

Throughout the existence of the rivalry, the pair have dominated awards ceremonies and broken a multitude of goalscoring records for both club and country, feats which have been described as "incredible", "ridiculous" and "remarkable". The rivalry itself has been described as one about records and reputation of the players, rather than one based in loathing.

Messi is the all-time La Liga top scorer, as well as having the most assists in the competition's history – with Ronaldo in second for goals scored and in third for assists provided – while Ronaldo is the UEFA Champions League all-time top goalscorer and assist provider, with Messi in second for goals scored and assists provided in the competition's history. The two had broken each other's record over the course of 2015 after Messi surpassed the previous record holder Raúl in November 2014. Ronaldo opened a gap in the 2015–16 season when he became the first player to score double figures in the group stage of the Champions League, setting the record at 11 goals. They are the first two players to score 100 goals in UEFA Champions League history.

They dominated the Ballon d'Or/The Best FIFA Men's Player awards since 2008, and UEFA Men's Player of the Year Award since 2014; in 2018, their longer than a decade triumph was interrupted by Luka Modrić, seen as "the end of an era". In an interview for the France Football, Modrić stated that "history will say that a Croatian player, representing his small country, won the Ballon d'Or after Cristiano Ronaldo and Lionel Messi, who are players at another level. Nobody has the right to compare themselves to them." 

Messi won four consecutive Ballon d'Or awards (2009 to 2012), with a fifth coming in 2015, while Ronaldo had equalled Messi's total of five with wins in 2013, 2014, 2016, and 2017. In 2019, Messi took the lead again by earning his sixth Ballon d'Or, finishing just seven points ahead of second-placed Virgil van Dijk, with Ronaldo finishing third. In 2020, the award was canceled due to the COVID-19 pandemic and in 2021, Messi won Ballon d'Or for the seventh time. In total, Messi and Ronaldo reached the podium a record thirteen and twelve times respectively. Combining Ballon d'Or, FIFA World Player of the Year and The Best FIFA Men's Player, Messi outperformed Ronaldo 10 to 8 in the first place and 22 to 20 in the podium.

Messi won eight Pichichi trophies and six European Golden Shoe awards (2010, 2012, 2013, 2017, 2018 and 2019). Ronaldo won the European Golden Shoe award on four occasions (2008, 2011, 2014 and 2015) and remains the only footballer with top-flight top scorer awards in England (2008), Spain (2011, 2014 and 2015) and Italy (2021). He was the Champions League top scorer on seven occasions, with Messi achieving this feat six times (including in 2015 when the pair finished joint-top).

Messi has won a total 42 major trophies (including a club record 35 major trophies as a Barcelona player), claiming ten league titles, four Champions Leagues, seven Copa del Rey titles, eight Spanish Super Cups, three European Super Cups, and three FIFA Club World Cups. Messi was runner-up at three Copa Américas and at the 2014 World Cup, before finally claiming his first major international trophy at the 2021 Copa América, where he was named best player. The following year, Messi led Argentina to the 2022 World Cup trophy, where he won his second Golden Ball award.

Ronaldo has won 34 major trophies, including seven league titles and five Champions Leagues, and guided Portugal to their first UEFA Euro 2016 and 2019 UEFA Nations League trophies. He has also won four national cups, two league cups, seven national super cups, three European Super Cups, and four FIFA Club World Cups.

Player statistics

Club statistics 

Notes

International statistics

Hat-tricks

Head-to-head 
Over the time both Messi and Ronaldo played in La Liga, the Real Madrid–Barcelona rivalry has been "encapsulated" by the individual rivalry between Ronaldo and Messi to some extent. No El Clásico encounter between the two ever finished goalless.

Head-to-head summary 

Last updated 19 January 2023

See also 
 List of association football rivalries between players

References

External links 

 Messi vs. Ronaldo

-
Football rivalries in Spain
Cristiano Ronaldo
Ronaldo
Individual rivalries in sports